John Bromley (died 10 January 1717) was an English clergyman, Catholic convert, and translator.

Life
Bromley was a native of Shropshire. He was educated at Shrewsbury School and Magdalene College, Cambridge, according to Venn, although his biographer Thompson Cooper, in the Dictionary of National Biography tentatively identified him with a John Bromley who was a student at Christ Church, Oxford who graduated B.A. in 1685 and M.A. in 1688.

At the beginning of James II's reign he was curate of St. Giles's-in-the-Fields, London, but soon afterwards he joined the Roman Catholic Church and obtained employment as a corrector of the press in the king's printing-house. On being deprived of this means of subsistence, he established a boarding-school in London which was attended by the sons of many persons of rank. Charles Dodd claimed he taught Alexander Pope. Later Bromley was appointed tutor to some young gentlemen, and travelled with them abroad.

His death occurred at Madeley, Shropshire on 10 January 1717.

Works
According to Dodd, he published The Catechism for the Curats, composed by the Decree of the Council of Trent, faithfully translated into English (London 1687). He was probably also the translator of The Canons and Decrees of the Council of Trent (London 1687).

References

Attribution

Year of birth missing
1717 deaths
Schoolteachers from Shropshire
Alumni of Magdalene College, Cambridge
17th-century English Anglican priests
English Roman Catholics
English translators
18th-century English non-fiction writers
18th-century English male writers
18th-century English writers
18th-century English educators
English religious writers
English male non-fiction writers
Anglican priest converts to Roman Catholicism